David Pitt (born 2 September 1991) is a Vincentian international footballer who currently plays for Ashford Town.

Club career
Pitt was an apprentice at Brentford, breaking into the club's reserve team. He was loaned to Worthing on work experience towards the end of the 2009–10 season. After playing for Ascot United between 2015 and 2016, he signed for Brackley Town in the summer of 2016. He subsequently played for Hayes & Yeading United and Barton Rovers in 2017, Bedfont Sports in 2018–19, Chalfont St Peter in 2019, Stratford Town and Broadfields United in 2020. In 2021 he signed for Staines Town.

International career
After playing two matches for the Jamaica under-18 side, Pitt switched allegiance to St Vincent. He was called up to the St Vincent squad for the 2018 World Cup qualifier matches against Trinidad & Tobago. He made his debut in a 3–2 defeat at home in the first match on 25 March 2016, and was an unused substitute in the return match on 29 March, which Trinidad won 6–0. He won his second cap in a 2017 Caribbean Cup qualification match against Suriname on 4 June.

References

External links

1991 births
Living people
Saint Vincent and the Grenadines footballers
Saint Vincent and the Grenadines international footballers
Association football forwards
Saint Vincent and the Grenadines expatriate footballers
Brentford F.C. players
Worthing F.C. players
APEP FC players
Ascot United F.C. players
Brackley Town F.C. players
Hayes & Yeading United F.C. players
Barton Rovers F.C. players
Bedfont Sports F.C. players
Chalfont St Peter A.F.C. players
Stratford Town F.C. players
Broadfields United F.C. players
Cypriot Second Division players
Expatriate footballers in Cyprus